Albert Isaac Adams (September 21, 1865 – February 5, 1906) was an American politician in the state of Washington. He served in the Washington House of Representatives from 1891 to 1893.  He was born in Livonia, New York on September 21, 1865, attended the University of Rochester, and moved to Seattle in 1887. A real estate lawyer, he was the youngest member of the legislature during his term.

References

Republican Party members of the Washington House of Representatives
People from Livonia, New York
1865 births
1906 deaths
19th-century American politicians